David McGarry is an American musician, singer, voice actor, music producer, and composer.

Career
McGarry is best known for voicing Sergeant Joe "Red" Hartsock in the Brothers in Arms video game series and as the lead singer, guitarist, and primary songwriter for the Dallas-based rock band Preston Grey. He formerly served as the audio director and producer at Gearbox Software, who developed the Brothers in Arms series, and composed the original score for Brothers in Arms: Earned in Blood.

Personal life
McGarry was a close friend of fellow voice actor and musician Troy Baker before they fell out over a woman they were both interested in, and they lost contact for several years until reconciling during the production of Brothers in Arms: Road to Hill 30.

References

External links
 David McGarry on IMDb

Year of birth missing (living people)
Living people
American male voice actors
American record producers
American male composers
21st-century American composers
21st-century American male musicians